4-Fluorophenibut (developmental code name CGP-11130; also known as β-(4-fluorophenyl)-γ-aminobutyric acid or β-(4-fluorophenyl)-GABA) is a GABAB receptor agonist which was never marketed. It is selective for the GABAB receptor over the GABAA receptor (IC50 = 1.70 μM and > 100 μM, respectively). The drug is a GABA analogue and is closely related to baclofen (β-(4-chlorophenyl)-GABA), tolibut (β-(4-methylphenyl)-GABA), and phenibut (β-phenyl-GABA). It is less potent as a GABAB receptor agonist than baclofen but more potent than phenibut.

The substance is sometimes referred to as 4F-phenibut or F-phenibut and colloquially as fluorobut.

Legal status
F-Phenibut is a prohibited substance in Lithuania and Hungary.

References

Amines
Carboxylic acids
Experimental drugs
Fluoroarenes
GABA analogues
GABAB receptor agonists